Tanzir Tuhin is a Bangladeshi musician, singer-songwriter, actor, painter, and architect, best known as a longtime member of the independent music group Shironamhin. He joined the group as lead vocalist in 2000. Shironamhin subsequently achieved national success with their albums Bondho Janala, Shironamhin Rabindranath and Shironamhin Shironamhin. By the late 2000s, they had become one of the most well-known group in the rock music history of Bangladesh. Amid personal conflict, Tuhin left Shironamhin in 2017 and form a new band named Avash at the end of that year.

Tuhin has a well reputed solo career which has included several studio soundtracks: Tobu is the first solo track has been scheduled to release in 2017.

In 2014, Tuhin has taken part as host for BBC's reality television series Amrai Pari to raising public awareness about combat extreme weather. In 2016, he took part "Inauguration drive for Toys R Yours season 2" for children most of whom are from are from underprivileged families.

Early life and education 

Tanzir Tuhin was born in Dhaka, Bangladesh. He spent his childhood there.

Tuhin attended Government Laboratory High School in Dhaka up to the tenth grade. He got higher secondary from Dhaka College, and afterwards studied in the Bangladesh University of Engineering and Technology in Architecture. For the first several years, when was in fifth standard in school, Tuhin learned Nazrul Geeti and classical music from Bulbul Lalitakala Academy, where Narayan Chandra Basak, Akhtar Sadmani, Kiran Chandra Roy, Rafiqul Islam, Tapan Mahmud, and the legendary Ustad Niaz Mohammad Chowdhury were his music masters.

2000–2017: Shironamhin 

In 2000 Tuhin joined the progressive rock band Shironamhin as a vocal with the founding member of the group songwriter, bass guitarist Ziaur Rahman Zia, guitarist Jewel and Bulbul. Their first album Jahaji was released in 2004. Since they have released 5 studio albums and several mixed albums. Their latest album titled Shironamhin Shironamhin was released on July 19, 2013. Amid creative differences, Tuhin left this group in October 2017.

2017 ~ : Solo career 

In 2017 Tuhin left Shironamhin to pursue an independent musical career. He has been working on a number of songs with different musicians and composers in the Bangladeshi musical industry.

Tuhin's solo career to date includes 4 studio soundtracks: Tobuo is the first solo track has been scheduled to release in 2017. Also a movie-tracks "Shotto Mitthar Kundoli" in the movie "Deho Station" got critical acclaim among the music critics as well as was appreciated by his fan base. He also did a second solo, 'Bibek' in 2019.
In 2020, he released another single, titled, Alo. Written and composed by the versatile composer-lyricist, Prince Mahmud. It is dedicated to Ayub Bachchu.

Acting 

Tuhin made his acting debut in Madharatrite Tinjon Durbhaga Torun, a television film adaptation of the story of the same name by Muhammed Zafar Iqbal. Gradually he appeared in the television films, Thotomoto Ei Shohore directed by Mahdy Hasan in 2011, Spook by Tanim Rahman Angshu in 2011, and Trump Card II by Mizanur Rahman Aryan in 2013.

Painting 

Tuhin also loves to paint and has a huge collection of paintings. From doodles, portraits to abstract & modern strokes, water colour to oil paintings, Tuhin has a unique painting style which is very reflective of his growing up in urbanism. A solo painting exhibition of his was held in Alliance Française de Dhaka, Dhanmondi in the year 2000. Tuhin also has designed book covers for a number of books. He has also done the internal decoration of these books.

Personal life 
Tuhin is married to Laboni Ferdous, and the couple have two children: Shanto and Neha.

Discography

Singles

Film Scores

Band (Avash)

Shironamhin

Film Scores

Mixed albums

Television

References

External links 

 
 
 

Living people
1974 births
Shironamhin
Bangladeshi male musicians
Dhaka College alumni
Bangladesh University of Engineering and Technology alumni